The canton of Vimoutiers is an administrative division of the Orne department, northwestern France. Its borders were modified at the French canton reorganisation which came into effect in March 2015. Its seat is in Vimoutiers.

It consists of the following communes:
 
Aubry-le-Panthou
Avernes-Saint-Gourgon
Le Bosc-Renoult
Camembert
Canapville
Les Champeaux
Champosoult
Chaumont
Cisai-Saint-Aubin
Coulmer
Croisilles
Crouttes
La Fresnaie-Fayel
Fresnay-le-Samson
Gacé
Guerquesalles
Mardilly
Ménil-Hubert-en-Exmes
Neuville-sur-Touques
Orgères
Pontchardon
Le Renouard
Résenlieu
Roiville
Saint-Aubin-de-Bonneval
Saint-Evroult-de-Montfort
Saint-Germain-d'Aunay
Le Sap-André
Sap-en-Auge
Ticheville
La Trinité-des-Laitiers
Vimoutiers

References

Cantons of Orne